Cerithium madreporicola is a species of sea snail, a marine gastropod mollusk in the family Cerithiidae.

The true Cerithium madreporicola is a fossil species known only from raised Quaternary reefs in the Red Sea. The name has been applied in error to a Recent species from the Philippines and Indonesia, which has later been named as Cerithium kreukelorum.

Description

Distribution
The distribution of Cerithium madreporicola includes the Red Sea.

References

 Jousseaume F. (1931 ["1930"]) Cerithiidae de la Mer Rouge. Journal de Conchyliologie 74(4): 270–296. [Posthumous work edited by E. Lamy; Published 9 February 1931] page(s): 275

External links

Cerithiidae
Gastropods described in 1930